Peliosanthes is a genus of flowering plants found  in eastern Asia. In the APG III classification system, it is placed in the family Asparagaceae, subfamily Nolinoideae (formerly the family Ruscaceae).

Species accepted:

Peliosanthes argenteostriata Aver. & N.Tanaka - Vietnam
Peliosanthes caesia J.M.H.Shaw - Thailand
Peliosanthes curnberlegii K.Larsen - Thailand
Peliosanthes dehongensis H.Li - Yunnan
Peliosanthes divaricatanthera N.Tanaka - Yunnan, Vietnam
Peliosanthes gracilipes (Craib) N.Tanaka - Thailand, Laos
Peliosanthes grandiflora Aver. & N.Tanaka - Vietnam
Peliosanthes griffithii Baker - Sikkim, Nepal
Peliosanthes kaoi Ohwi - Taiwan
Peliosanthes macrophylla Wall. ex Baker - Assam, Bhutan, Nepal, Yunnan
Peliosanthes macrostegia Hance - Guangdong, Guangxi, Guizhou, Hunan, Sichuan, Taiwan, Yunnan 
Peliosanthes nivea Aver. & N.Tanaka - Vietnam
Peliosanthes nutans Aver. & N.Tanaka - Vietnam
Peliosanthes ophiopogonoides F.T.Wang & Tang - Yunnan
Peliosanthes pachystachya W.H.Chen & Y.M.Shui - Yunnan
Peliosanthes reflexa M.N.Tamura & Ogisu - Guangxi
Peliosanthes retroflexa Aver. & N.Tanaka - Vietnam
Peliosanthes sessilis H.Li - Yunnan
Peliosanthes sinica F.T.Wang & Tang - Yunnan, Guangxi
Peliosanthes subcoronata N.Tanaka - Laos
Peliosanthes teta Andrews - southern China, Himalayas, Indochina, Malaysia, western Indonesia
Peliosanthes weberi (L.Rodr.) N.Tanaka - Thailand, Laos, Cambodia, Vietnam
Peliosanthes yunnanensis F.T.Wang & Tang - Yunnan, Vietnam

References

Asparagaceae genera
Nolinoideae
Taxa named by Henry Cranke Andrews